Angry Cyclist is the eleventh studio album by Scottish folk rock duo The Proclaimers. The album was released on 10 August 2018 on the label Cooking Vinyl. The album spawned the titular single "Angry Cyclist", accompanied by a music video. Charting at No. 2 in Scotland, as well as at No. 17 on the UK Albums Chart and No. 3 on the Indie Charts, the release of Angry Cyclist was followed by a promotional tour of the United Kingdom, Canada, Iceland, Asia and Australia.

Receiving a generally favourable reception, AllMusic praising the record an example of the band's best work, Angry Cyclist included politically angled songs reflecting Brexit and Donald Trump, and absorbed a variegation of influences including country, jangle pop and soul.

Production
The album was produced by Dave Eringa who produced The Proclaimers' previous album Let's Hear It for the Dogs, and was likewise recorded in Wales at Rockfield Studios.

Release
Angry Cyclist was released on 10 August 2018. Released through Cooking Vinyl, the album saw Europe-wide release on CD, as well as vinyl and cassette releases in the UK.

Style and content

Lyrical themes
The lyrics of Angry Cyclist included political themes. The title-track "Angry Cyclist" reflected dismay at a societal shift to the political right following Brexit and the election of Donald Trump, band member Craig Reid metaphorically likening "sweating, angry cyclists “hemmed in” by city traffic with the polarisation of political discourse", the song was hailed "a metaphor for our times". "Classy" was a wry insight into the "ludicrous strata" of the British class system. The sentimental ballad "Streets of Edinburgh" looked backwards and forwards at the city where the band spend their formative years.

Musical style 
AllMusic opined that The Proclaimers "present a mix of style influences" on Angry Cyclist, ordaining "The Battle of the Booze" as "countrified" and entailing "Information"'s R&B infusions. "Sometimes It's the Fools" rang out with what The Scotsman described as a "pithy and pacey jangle", remindful of R.E.M., declaring "You Make Me Happy" to be a "direct and driving Celtic soul stormer" and "A Way with Words" a "twanging country rock’n’roller".

Reception

Critical reception 

According to Metacritic, Angry Cyclist received a score of 77/100 based in 5 reviews, suggesting "generally positive reviews". Marcy Donelson of AllMusic described the record as "one of [the band's] best" and "the type of album that would be fun see performed live in full". In an eight-out-of-ten review, Bryan Willitson of Toronto-based publication The Spill Magazine opined that the album had "many moments to enjoy" and that it "grows on the listener with each successive spin". The Skinny, in a four out-of five-star review by Alan O'Hare, while acknowledging the album to offer "a little less gravitas than usual", stated that " the taut Telecasters that dominate The Proclaimers' eleventh studio album provide a tension that seems to sit well within [...] these prescient compositions", and further alluded to the track "Classy" as "lyrical genius". The Scotsman complimented Angry Cyclist as one of the band's "most cutting collections" and that "every track brims with confidence".

Accolades 
Angry Cyclist ranked at No. 64 on 100 Best Albums of 2018 by UK music retailer Fopp.

Touring
The Proclaimers embarked on a worldwide tour following the release of Angry Cyclist. The 2018 leg of the Angry Cyclist tour saw the band perform 43 shows and 5 festivals in the United Kingdom, as well as 13 concerts in Canada supported by the English indie folk artist Siobhan Wilson. The 2019 portion included performances that April in Reykjavik, Dubai and Singapore, as well as a 10-date tour of Australia that May. The tour concluded with a performance on 14 September 2019 at The Hydro in Glasgow, Scotland. The Angry Cyclist tour saw the duo perform to over 400,000 people across 111 performances.

Track listing

Personnel

 The Proclaimers
 Craig Reid - vocals
 Charlie Reid - acoustic guitar, vocals

 Additional performers
 Stevie Christie - keyboards
 Garry John Kane - bass guitar
 Zac Ware - electric guitar, classic guitar, pedal steel, mandolin
 Clive Jenner - drums, percussion
 Sean Genockey - guitar
 Andrew Walters - string arrangements, violin
 Tanwen Evans - violin
 Carly Stone - cello
 Nathan Stone - cello
 John McCusker - fiddle

 Technical
 Dave Eringa - production, programming
 Joe Jones - engineering 
 Jack Boston - engineering 
 Ed Woods - mastering 
 Lewis MacDonald - front cover design
 Luke Insect - sleeve design 
 Murdro MacLeod - liner notes photography

Chart performance

References

2018 albums
Cooking Vinyl albums
The Proclaimers albums
Albums recorded at Rockfield Studios